A love object is an object of love;  see Love and Object relations theory.

Love object may also refer to:
 Object sexuality, where the love object is inanimate
 Love Object, a 2003 horror film
 The Love Object, a book by Edna O'Brien